The 1964 Cupa României Final was the 26th final of Romania's most prestigious football cup competition. It was disputed between Dinamo București and Steaua București, and was won by Dinamo București after a game with 8 goals. It was the 2nd cup for Dinamo București.

Match details

See also 
List of Cupa României finals

References

External links
Romaniansoccer.ro

1964
Cupa
Romania
1964 Cupa Romaniei
FC Steaua București matches